Charles Herbert Hudson (1872 – 1955) was an English professional footballer who played as a full-back.

References

1872 births
1955 deaths
Footballers from Birmingham, West Midlands
English footballers
Association football fullbacks
Grimsby Town F.C. players
English Football League players